Eamonn Melaugh (born 4 July 1933) is an Irish socialist, political campaigner and activist from Derry, Northern Ireland. 

He helped found the Derry Housing Action Committee (DHAC) and the Derry Unemployment Action Committee (DUAC) which campaigned for jobs and housing for Derry Catholics.

As a result, Melaugh and the DHAC became involved with the Northern Ireland Civil Rights Association in the late 1960s. He later contributed evidence to the Bloody Sunday Inquiry.

He is an active member of the Workers' Party, and has stood as a candidate for it and its predecessor, Republican Clubs/Official Sinn Féin, in the Foyle constituency.

Personal life
Melaugh married Mary McLaughlin in 1956; the couple had 11 children, 4 daughters and 7 sons. One son, Martin, curates the University of Ulster's CAIN website. His nephew is the comedian and TV presenter Andrew Doyle.

References

1933 births
Living people
Workers' Party (Ireland) politicians
Place of birth missing (living people)